Champlain College is a private college in Burlington, Vermont. Founded in 1878, Champlain offers on-campus undergraduate and online undergraduate courses through Champlain College Online, along with online certificate and degree programs and master's degree programs, in more than 80 subject areas. Champlain enrolls 2,200 undergraduate students on its Burlington, Vermont campus from 44 states and 17 countries.

History
Champlain was founded in 1878 as Burlington Business School, opened by G.W. Thompson, to prepare young men for “the business cares and responsibilities of life.” In 1884, when E. George Evans acquired the school, it became coeducational and changed its name to Queen City Business College. In 1905 it moved to Bank Street, and in 1910 to moved again to Main Street. A. Gordon Tittemore acquired the college in 1920, and renamed it Burlington Business College. In 1958, the College took on its current name and moved to its present location in the Hill Section of Burlington. That year, it offered associate degree programs and enrolled about 60 students.

Champlain College opened its first dormitories, Jensen and Sanders Halls, in 1965. It started new programs in social services in the 1970s, opened the Willett Foster Hall, home to the Engineering Technology Division, in 1982, and added the Hauke Family Campus Center in 1989. Champlain offered its first bachelor's degree programs in Business and Accounting in 1990; three years later it began its first online education programs. In 2002, Champlain launched its first master's degree program in Managing Innovation & Information Technology. 
The College's library, the Robert E. and Holly D. Miller Information Commons, opened in 1998 and in 2004 the school dedicated the S.D. Ireland Family Center for Global Business & Technology, now home to the Stiller School of Business. The following year, the IDX Student Life Center opened. Also in 2005,  David F. Finney was inaugurated as the Champlain's seventh president, and the College added a Master of Business Administration as its second master's degree.

In 2006, President David F. Finney launched several new initiatives, including the Emergent Media Center; the Champlain College Center for Digital Investigation, now called the Senator Patrick Leahy Center for Digital Investigations; and the Conference and Event Center.  Champlain also introduced two new scholarship programs: the New American Student Scholarship, for students with refugee or asylum status, and the Vermont First Scholarship for first-generation college students from Vermont, and the College launched its BYOBiz program, which promotes student entrepreneurship.

In 2007 the College opened a study-abroad campus in Montreal, Canada, followed by second study-abroad campus in Dublin, Ireland in 2008. Later that year, Champlain established the Core Division, followed by the Life Experience & Action Dimension (LEAD) program in 2009.

In 2010, Champlain began offering an MFA in Emergent Media and a BS in Environmental Policy, and introduced the Center for Financial Literacy and the Champlain College Publishing Initiative. That same year, Roger H. Perry Hall was renovated. Perry Hall received LEED Platinum certification in 2012, and now houses the Advising and Registration Center, Admissions, Financial Aid, Public Relations, and serves as a general purpose Student Welcome Center. In October 2012, Champlain College received the largest gift in the college's history, a gift of $10 million from the Stiller Family Foundation that established the Stiller School of Business and helped fund the Perry Hall Welcome and Admission Center, as well as to begin work on the Center for Communications & Creative Media, which was opened in fall 2015. 
In fall of 2013, Champlain was prominently featured in an article in The Atlantic, "What Would an Ideal College Look Like? A Lot Like This," as part of the magazine's “American Futures” series, which looked at American cities that are home to intriguing innovations and entrepreneurship.

President David F. Finney retired in June, 2014, and Donald J. Laackman, president of Harold Washington College, became Champlain's eighth president in July 2014.

Campus

Main Campus 
Champlain's campus consists of 42 buildings on about 2.5 city blocks in the residential Hill Section of Burlington, Vermont. Most of the student residence halls are renovated Victorian-era houses. Champlain College also offers Contemporary Housing. In 2014, Champlain opened its newest on-campus residence, Valcour Hall. In November 2018, the institution's first Apartment-Style residence hall, 194. St Paul St, was opened. The hall is 0.5 miles away from the main campus and currently houses 314 upperclassmen. About 750 students reside on campus, others occupy off-campus college housing, and many live independently. There are 27 residence halls.

The IDX Student Life Center houses the dining hall, gym, fitness center, lounge and game room. All Champlain students have full access to campus computer labs, 3D animation and game production labs, multimedia classrooms and editing suites, a digital photography lab and darkroom, the Metz Studio Barn, the Emergent Media Center and the Senator Leahy Center for Digital Investigation. In 2014, Champlain opened its Makers’ Lab and opened the new Communication & Creative Media building in 2015.

Academic buildings include the Hauke Family Campus Center, the S.D. Ireland Family Center for Global Business & Technology, and the Miller Information Commons. Facilities available include 3D animation and game production labs, multimedia classrooms and editing suites, and a photo lab and darkroom.

Lakeside Campus 
Located 1.5 miles southwest of the Main Campus is Miller Center and the residential student parking lot. Miller Center contains the Emergent Media Center, a collaborative work studio that acts as a student work space while also accepting commission work from the public. Miller Center also includes the Makerspace, where students can access equipment such as 3D printers/scanners, laser and vinyl cutters, power tools and more.

International campuses
Champlain College has campuses in Dublin, Ireland and Montréal, Canada in addition to global partnerships with institutions around the world. Students are encouraged to study abroad.

Champlain College's Montréal campus opened its doors in 2007 with classroom space located at Rue Sherbooke Est. Students live in the Université du Québec à Montréal's (UQAM's) residence hall with local and international students. Champlain students in all programs are eligible to spend a semester in Montréal.

Champlain's Dublin campus has been in use since 2008. The Academic Center is located at 43 Leeson Street Lower, near Dublin's Georgian Office District, and comprises four classrooms, a computer lab, and a lounge. Experiential courses teach students about Ireland's economy, music, cultural heritage, and history.

Academics

Champlain College's "Upside Down Curriculum" allows students to take courses related to their major starting in the first semester.

Undergraduate education
Champlain offers 29 undergraduate degrees on campus, 15 associate and bachelor's degrees and 25 undergraduate certificates online. It also offers 24 graduate degrees that can be pursued either on campus or online.

Starting with the class of 2011, general education was taught in the form of an interdisciplinary core curriculum. Each course brings together three or four discrete disciplines with the use of various literature and open-ended discussion topics. First-year courses focus on the self, second-year on the community, and third year on global topics. Through courses such as Rhetoric, Concepts of the Self, and Concepts of Community, students gain a background in the liberal arts and sciences.

In the fall of 2008, incoming students began to participate in an out-of-the-classroom life skills program. This life skills program, called the Life Experience and Action Dimension or LEAD, is part of Champlain's Education in 3-D initiative. LEAD aims to build knowledge in four areas: understanding personality styles, building inclusive community, lifelong career management, and financial sophistication.

One part of the Core is the Global Module. This is a discussion forum between Champlain students and students from other countries. The module contains a guided discussion on important issues. The Global Module is required.

Champlain College Online 
Champlain College Online was established in 1992 as a part of Champlain College. The college offers over 60 online degree programs, including associate, undergraduate, and graduate degrees, as well as certificate programs, encompassing four in-demand areas of study: Business, Cybersecurity, Healthcare, and Information Technology. The programs and degrees delivered online have the same curriculum and accreditation as the traditional residential on-campus programs.

Student life

In addition to student-run clubs, the college also hosts intramural sports.

The Center for Service and Sustainability is a community service and civic engagement based club that participates in a number of activities such as Tent City (a fundraiser to raise homeless awareness and money for COTS (Committee on Temporary Shelter), and the DREAM program (a mentoring program for underprivileged children).

There is a Student Government Association.

Publications
Willard and Maple is an international literary magazine published by Champlain College, with the editorial board made up of both faculty and students.

Student demographics
Champlain College enrolls 2,200 undergraduate students from 44 states and 18 countries. 62% of students are male and 38% female. The college has a 12:1 student/faculty ratio, and the average class size at Champlain is 16, with a maximum class size of 30.

Notable alumni
Jeremy Bishop (attended 1999-2001), basketball player at Champlain and Quinnipiac Colleges
Clem Bissonnette (A.A., 1965), member of the Vermont House of Representatives
Steven Crowder (attended), conservative political commentator
Rusty DeWees (A.A., 1984), entertainer
Maxyne Finkelstein (M.S., 2015), non-profit organization executive
Volodymyr Heninson (graduated, 2001), president of soccer's Ukrainian Premier League
James McNeil (A.S. 1978), member of the Vermont House of Representatives and Vermont Senate
Jaime Peterson (attended 1991–1993), professional basketball player
Laura Sibilia (attended), member of the Vermont House of Representatives
Donald H. Turner (A.S. 1984), member of the Vermont House of Representatives

See also 
 List of colleges and universities in Vermont
 Champlain Regional College, an unrelated institution in Canada. 
 Willard & Maple, a magazine published by Champlain College.

References

External links 

 

 
Education in Burlington, Vermont
Private universities and colleges in Vermont
Educational institutions established in 1878
Education in Chittenden County, Vermont
Buildings and structures in Burlington, Vermont
1878 establishments in Vermont